Kristen Kish (born December 1, 1983) is a Korean-born American chef known for winning the tenth season of Top Chef. She was formerly chef de cuisine at Menton in the Fort Point neighborhood of Boston. She is the host of 36 Hours on Travel Channel and a co-host of Fast Foodies on TruTV as well as co-host of Iron Chef: Quest for an Iron Legend.

Early life and education
Kristen Kish was born in Seoul, South Korea, and adopted by a family in Kentwood, Michigan, at the age of four months.  She worked as a model in high school.
She attended Le Cordon Bleu in Chicago, earning an A.A. in culinary arts.

Career
Kish became an instructor at Stir, a culinary demonstration kitchen in Boston, Massachusetts.  In 2012, Kish was promoted to Stir's chef de cuisine by the owner, Barbara Lynch. She was the chef de cuisine at Barbara Lynch's Menton in Boston until March 2014. In 2017, she released a book of recipes co-authored with Meredith Erickson, Kristen Kish Cooking: Recipes and Techniques. In May 2018, Kish became chef at her new restaurant Arlo Grey in Austin, Texas.

Top Chef
Kish competed in Bravo's Top Chef in 2012.  She was invited to participate in the qualifying rounds alongside her close friend from culinary school Stephanie Cmar, being tasked with creating a signature soup that would be judged by Emeril Lagasse.  Kish passed the challenge and moved on into the competition proper (Cmar, however, was not so fortunate).  From there Kish won four elimination challenges, creating dishes as varied as French cuisine and onion rings, before being eliminated during "Restaurant Wars" (episode 11). She was able to win her way back into the main competition with five consecutive victories in "Last Chance Kitchen", ultimately making it to the finale with Brooke Williamson. Kish defeated Williamson and was crowned the Top Chef, becoming the first competitor to win after winning "Last Chance Kitchen" and the second female winner in the history of the Top Chef franchise.

36 Hours
In 2015 Kish co-hosted the pilot season of 36 Hours, a series on the Travel Channel with Kyle Martino, a TV analyst and former soccer player. The show, an adaptation of the New York Times travel column of the same name, follows Kish and Martino as they spend 36 hours eating, drinking, and exploring a given city.

Fast Foodies
Starting in 2021, Kish is one of three chefs featured on TruTV's cooking competition show Fast Foodies, alongside Jeremy Ford (winner of Top Chef: California) and Justin Sutherland (winner of an Iron Chef America episode, participant on Top Chef: Kentucky). In each episode, a celebrity presents their favorite fast-food item. The chefs then compete in two rounds.  First, they try to duplicate the dish as exactly as possible.  Second, they re-imagine the item in a haute-cuisine interpretation.

Iron Chef: Quest for an Iron Legend
Kish serves as one of the co-presenters, alongside Alton Brown and Chairman Mark Dacascos, on Iron Chef: Quest for an Iron Legend, the 2022 Netflix revival of the Iron Chef franchise. Kish provides running commentary with Brown on the competition and often serves as the show's floor reporter, coming down to the kitchen floor to check with chefs on what they are doing.

Personal life
On March 28, 2014, Kish publicly came out after announcing the first anniversary of the relationship with her girlfriend at the time, Jacqueline Westbrook, over Instagram. On September 29, 2019, Kish announced her engagement to Bianca Dusic, who is the VP of Food & Beverage for Standard Hotels, in an Instagram post. They married on April 18, 2021.

References

External links
 Bravo TV.com, http://www.bravotv.com/people/kristen-kish/bio , accessed 3 March 2013.

Top Chef winners
Living people
American adoptees
Chefs from Boston
American women chefs
South Korean emigrants to the United States
Alumni of Le Cordon Bleu
1983 births
People from Kentwood, Michigan
LGBT people from Michigan
American LGBT people of Asian descent
South Korean lesbians
American lesbians
Asian American chefs
21st-century American women
LGBT chefs